Crataegus douglasii is a North American species of hawthorn known by the common names black hawthorn and Douglas' thornapple. It is most abundant in the Pacific Northwest.

Description
Thorns along the branches are 1–2.5 cm long.

White flowers with greenish centers grow in bunches at the ends of each thin branch. The fruit is a blackish pome up to about 1 cm across, containing 3–5 rocklike seeds.

Taxonomy 
The species is named after David Douglas, who collected seed from the plant during his botanical explorations.

Formerly placed within the species, Crataegus douglasii var. duchesnensis is now considered to be a synonym of Crataegus saligna.

Distribution
The thorny shrub is native to northern and western North America, where it grows in varied habitats from forest to scrubland. It is most abundant in the Pacific Northwest.

Ecology
The foliage is browsed by cattle and sheep. Various birds, including quail, the Hungarian partridge, and ring-necked pheasant feed on the berries, as do bears and other animals. Magpies nest in the branches. The species is a larval host to the gray hairstreak, mourning cloak, pale tiger swallowtail, and western tiger swallowtail.

Uses
The fruits were a good food source for Native American peoples such as the Cheyenne and Nlaka'pamux.

Gallery

See also 
 List of hawthorn species with black fruit

References

USDA Forest Service: Fire Effects Information System

External links
Jepson Manual Treatment - Crataegus douglasii
U.Mich: Ethnobotany
Crataegus douglasii - Photo gallery

douglasii
Flora of the Northwestern United States
Flora of Western Canada
Flora of California
Flora of the Great Lakes region (North America)
Flora of the North-Central United States
Flora of North America
Flora without expected TNC conservation status